The Children's Hospital at Montefiore (CHAM) is a nationally ranked pediatric acute care children's teaching hospital located in the Bronx, New York. The hospital has 193 pediatric beds and is affiliated with the Albert Einstein College of Medicine. The hospital is a member of the Montefiore health network and is the only children's hospital in the network. The hospital provides comprehensive pediatric specialties and subspecialties to infants, children, teens, and young adults aged 0–21 throughout the Bronx and New York state. Children's Hospital at Montefiore also sometimes treats adults that require pediatric care. While CHAM does have a pediatric emergency department, they do not have a pediatric trauma center and sends all pediatric trauma cases to the nearby Jacobi Medical Center's level II pediatric trauma center. The Children's Hospital at Montefiore is one of the largest providers of pediatric health services in New York state. The hospital is attached to Montefiore Medical Center and is affiliated with the Ronald McDonald House of New York.

History 
Historically, healthcare for children in the Bronx was handled through pediatric units within adult hospitals. In the late 1990s Montefiore Medical Center began raising money for the construction of a separate freestanding children's hospital for its pediatric population. In 1997, they announced the plan to create a new $100 million independent children's hospital adjacent to the main campus. Montefiore kept the detailed plans for the hospital under wraps during the construction.

The hospital raised $82 million through private donations and Montefiore took out a $55 million bank loan to fund the new project.

The plan called for a 10-floor, 155,000 square foot building with separate dedicated pediatric units for critically ill children, infants, children, teens and young adults, including an 18-bed pediatric intensive care unit. Rooms at the hospital were also planned to be all private rooms. CHAM included many amenities not seen before at Montefiore's pediatric units including space themes throughout the hospital including space artifacts donated by NASA, playrooms, TV's, and private rooms with beds for parents.

When the hospital opened in 2001, it was New York City's first new major children's hospital building in decades.

In 2007 the hospital received a $12 million donation from the John L. Greene Foundation to fund an expansion of the pediatric oncology program at the hospital. The next year, the hospital used the donation to open up a new outpatient infusion unit with 11 infusion beds and 5 exam rooms.

In 2020 to help deal with the surge of adult SARS-Cov-2 the hospital opened up its 40-bed 8th floor general pediatric unit to adults with the disease. The unit first accepted adults in early march and the final adult patient was discharged on May 2. Adults on the unit were treated by pediatric nurses and doctors during their stay. The process of the changeover from a pediatric unit to an adult unit was outlined in The Journal of Pediatrics. The hospital also expanded their pediatric emergency room age limit from 21 to 30.

About 
The hospital features an AAP verified level III neonatal intensive care unit.

Patient care units 
The hospital consists of several floors with patient care units. Some units include:

 28 bed adolescent unit for patients 13-21
 35 bed neonatal intensive care unit
 26 bed pediatric intensive care unit
 36 bed cardiology unit
17 bed pediatric emergency beds

Awards 
As of 2021 Children's Hospital at Montefiore has placed nationally in 5 ranked pediatric specialties on U.S. News & World Report.

See also 

 List of children's hospitals in the United States
 Children's hospital
 Montefiore Medical Center
 Albert Einstein College of Medicine

References

External links 

 https://www.cham.org/
https://www.einstein.yu.edu/departments/pediatrics/

Children's hospitals in the United States
Hospital buildings completed in 2001
Teaching hospitals in New York (state)
Teaching hospitals in New York City
Hospitals in the Bronx
Hospitals in New York (state)
Montefiore Health System
Norwood, Bronx
Children's hospitals in New York (state)